Odontocera is a genus of beetles in the family Cerambycidae, containing the following species:

 Odontocera albicans (Klug, 1825)
 Odontocera albitarsis Melzer, 1922
 Odontocera annulicornis Magno, 2001
 Odontocera apicalis (Klug, 1825)
 Odontocera apicula Bates, 1885
 Odontocera armipes Zajciw, 1963
 Odontocera aurocincta Bates, 1873
 Odontocera auropilosa Tippmann, 1953
 Odontocera baeri (Gounelle, 1913)
 Odontocera barnouini Penaherrera-Leiva & Tavakilian, 2003
 Odontocera beneluzi Penaherrera-Leiva & Tavakilian, 2003
 Odontocera bilobata Zajciw, 1965
 Odontocera bisulcata Bates, 1870
 Odontocera buscki Fisher, 1930
 Odontocera chrysostetha Bates, 1870
 Odontocera clara Bates, 1873
 Odontocera colon (Bates, 1870)
 Odontocera compressipes White, 1855
 Odontocera crocata Bates, 1873
 Odontocera cylindrica Audinet-Serville, 1833
 Odontocera darlingtoni Fisher, 1930
 Odontocera dice Newman, 1841
 Odontocera dispar Bates, 1870
 Odontocera exilis Fisher, 1947
 Odontocera fasciata (Olivier, 1795)
 Odontocera flavicauda Bates, 1873
 Odontocera flavirostris Melzer, 1930
 Odontocera furcifera Bates, 1870
 Odontocera fuscicornis Bates, 1885
 Odontocera globicollis Zajciw, 1971
 Odontocera gracilis (Klug, 1825)
 Odontocera hilaris Bates, 1873
 Odontocera hirundipennis Zajciw, 1962
 Odontocera javieri Tavakilian & Penaherrera-Leiva, 2003
 Odontocera josemartii Zayas, 1956
 Odontocera leucothea Bates, 1873
 Odontocera lineatocollis Melzer, 1934
 Odontocera longipennis Zajciw, 1962
 Odontocera malleri Melzer, 1934
 Odontocera margaritacea (Fabricius, 1801)
 Odontocera mellea White, 1855
 Odontocera melzeri Fisher, 1952
 Odontocera meridiana Fisher, 1953
 Odontocera molorchoides (White, 1855)
 Odontocera monnei Zajciw, 1968
 Odontocera monostigma (Bates, 1869)
 Odontocera morii Tavakilian & Penaherrera-Leiva, 2003
 Odontocera nevermanni Fisher, 1930
 Odontocera nigriclavis Bates, 1873
 Odontocera nigrovittata Tavakilian & Penaherrera-Leiva, 2003
 Odontocera ochracea Monné & Magno, 1988
 Odontocera ornaticollis Bates, 1870
 Odontocera parallela White, 1855
 Odontocera petiolata Bates, 1873
 Odontocera poecilopoda White, 1855
 Odontocera punctata (Klug, 1825)
 Odontocera pusilla Gounelle, 1911
 Odontocera quadrivittata Melzer, 1922
 Odontocera quiinaphila Penaherrera-Leiva & Tavakilian, 2003
 Odontocera quinquecallosa Zajciw, 1963
 Odontocera rugicollis Bates, 1880
 Odontocera sabatieri Tavakilian & Penaherrera-Leiva, 2003
 Odontocera sanguinolenta Bates, 1873
 Odontocera scabricollis Melzer, 1934
 Odontocera septemtuberculata Zajciw, 1963
 Odontocera signatipennis Zajciw, 1971
 Odontocera simplex White, 1855
 Odontocera solangae Magno, 2001
 Odontocera soror Gounelle, 1911
 Odontocera subtilis Monné & Magno, 1988
 Odontocera tibialis Zajciw, 1971
 Odontocera tridentifera Gounelle, 1913
 Odontocera triliturata Bates, 1870
 Odontocera triplaris Fisher, 1930
 Odontocera trisignata Gounelle, 1911
 Odontocera tuberculata Zajciw, 1967
 Odontocera tumidicollis Zajciw, 1965
 Odontocera typhoeus Fisher, 1947
 Odontocera villosa Monné & Magno, 1988
 Odontocera virgata Gounelle, 1911
 Odontocera vittipennis Bates, 1873
 Odontocera zeteki Fisher, 1930
 Odontocera zikani Melzer, 1927

References

 
Rhinotragini